Jacques-Henri Bernardin de Saint-Pierre (also called Bernardin de St. Pierre) (19 January 1737, in Le Havre – 21 January 1814, in Éragny, Val-d'Oise) was a French writer and botanist. He is best known for his 1788 novel Paul et Virginie, now largely forgotten, but in the 19th century a very popular children's book.

Biography
At the age of twelve he had read Robinson Crusoe and went with his uncle, a skipper, to the West-Indies. After returning from this trip he was educated as an engineer at the École des Ponts. Then he joined the French Army and was involved in the Seven Years' War against Prussia and England. In 1768 he traveled to Mauritius where he served as engineer and studied plants. In 1771 he became friendly with and a pupil of Jean-Jacques Rousseau. Together they studied the plants in and around Paris.

In 1795 he was elected to the Institut de France, in 1797 manager of the Botanical Gardens and in 1803 member of the Académie française.

Saint-Pierre was an avid advocate and practitioner of vegetarianism, and although he was a devout Christian was also heavily influenced by Enlightenment-era intellectuals like Voltaire and his mentor Rousseau.

Legacy
"Barye's predators devouring their living prey indulge the emotions in a Romantic way of course, but they also embody a romantically moralizing point of view like those held by Bernardin de Saint-Pierre, Mme de Staël, and Victor Hugo. The Oeuvres complètes of Bernardin de Saint-Pierre appeared in Paris in 1834 and was surely known to Barye, for the author was the former director of the zoo in the Jardin des Plantes and one of the "masters of genuine poetry" for the archromantic Mme de Staël. Bernardin de Saint-Pierre maintained that a carnivorous animal in devouring its prey alive committed a sin against the laws of its own nature."

Alexander von Humboldt, next to Charles Darwin the best known naturalist of the nineteenth century, belonged to the admirers of Bernardin de Saint-Pierre and cherished the novel Paul et Virginie.

Works
Voyage à l’Île de France, à l’île Bourbon et au cap de Bonne-Espérance (1773)
L’Arcadie (1781)
Études de la nature (1784)
Paul et Virginie (1788)
La Chaumière indienne (1790)
Le Café de Surate (1790)
Les Vœux d’un solitaire (1790)
De la nature de la morale (1798)
Voyage en Silésie (1807)
La Mort de Socrate (1808)
Harmonies de la nature (1815)

See also
Society of the Friends of Truth

References

External links 

 
 
 
 International Vegetarian Union,"The Ethics of Diet": Jacques-Henri Bernardin de Saint-Pierre

1737 births
1814 deaths
18th-century French botanists
18th-century French male writers
18th-century French novelists
18th-century French writers
19th-century French botanists
19th-century French writers
19th-century French male writers
Burials at Père Lachaise Cemetery
Corps des ponts
École des Ponts ParisTech alumni
French children's writers
French male novelists
French vegetarianism activists
Lycée Pierre-Corneille alumni
Members of the Académie Française
Writers from Le Havre
Scientists from Le Havre